Wangkhem Khogen Singh is a former Indian football player and current head coach of I-League club NEROCA. He was head coach of I-League side, Minerva Punjab, whom he led to the 2017–18 title.

Playing career
Born in Manipur, Singh has played for a variety of clubs including Air India, Salgaocar, Mumbai, and Tollygunge Agragami.

Coaching career

Minerva Punjab: 2017–2018
Prior to the start of the 2017–18 I-League season, Singh was appointed head coach of Minerva Punjab. By the end of the campaign, Singh had led the club to their first ever national league title in only their second season in India's top flight. Despite the success however, Singh left the club on 22 May 2018 after being told he would be demoted to a youth coaching role.

NEROCA FC: 2021–present
In July 2021, He is appointed as the head coach of inleague club NEROCA for the upcoming season. In 2022, he guided NEROCA in "Imphal Derby" at the Group-C opener during the 131st edition of Durand Cup, clinching a thrilling 3–1 win.

Statistics

Managerial statistics
.

Honours
Minerva Punjab
I-League: 2017-18

References

Living people
People from Manipur
Air India FC players
Salgaocar FC players
Association football defenders
National Football League (India) players
Indian footballers
Footballers from Manipur
Indian football managers
RoundGlass Punjab FC managers
I-League managers
Year of birth missing (living people)
NEROCA FC managers
Tollygunge Agragami FC players